The Centralia Massacre was an incident during the American Civil War in which 24 unarmed U.S. Army soldiers were captured and executed in Centralia, Missouri on September 27, 1864, by a band led by the pro-Confederate guerrilla leader William T. Anderson. Future outlaw Jesse James was among the guerrillas.

In the ensuing Battle of Centralia a large detachment of U.S. Army mounted infantry attempted to intercept Anderson, but nearly all of them were killed in combat.

Background
In 1864, the military forces of the Confederate States, faced with a rapidly deteriorating position, launched an invasion of northern Missouri. It was led by General Sterling Price and his Missouri State Guard. The objective was to influence the 1864 presidential election by capturing St. Louis and the state capitol at Jefferson City. As part of his strategy, Price encouraged guerrilla warfare, especially the disruption of the railroads. "Bloody Bill" Anderson and his guerrilla company were among those who took part.

On September 23, 1864, Anderson engaged in a skirmish in Boone County, Missouri, seven miles east of Rocheport. His men managed to kill eleven U.S. Army soldiers and three black civilian teamsters. The U.S. soldiers responded by shooting six of Anderson's men captured at a house in Rocheport the next day.

Also, on September 24, Anderson attacked the pro-U.S. town of Fayette, but the attack failed. Thirteen of Anderson's men were killed, and more than 30 were wounded. Only one U.S. soldier was killed, with two wounded.

Massacre
At 9:00 a.m. on September 27, Anderson, with about 80 guerrillas, some dressed in stolen U.S. Army uniforms, moved into Centralia to cut the North Missouri Railroad. The guerrillas looted the town and reportedly drank whiskey from stolen boots. Anderson blocked the North Missouri Railroad line, a fact that the engineer of an approaching train failed to realize until too late, as the men he saw were wearing blue uniforms. The guerrillas swarmed the train and divided the 125 passengers between civilians and soldiers. A total of 24 U.S. soldiers were aboard, all on leave after the Battle of Atlanta and heading to their homes in northwest Missouri or southwest Iowa.

The U.S. soldiers were ordered at gunpoint to strip off their uniforms. When Anderson called for an officer, Sergeant Thomas Goodman stepped forward, expecting to be shot so the rest would be spared. Instead, Anderson's men ignored Goodman and began shooting the others. Anderson's men then mutilated and scalped the bodies. The guerrillas then set fire to the train and sent it down the tracks toward Sturgeon, Missouri. They torched the depot and rode away from the town. Sergeant Goodman was taken prisoner on Anderson's orders; it was planned that he would be later exchanged for one of Anderson's men held prisoner by U.S. forces. Goodman spent ten days in the captivity of the guerrillas before escaping at night as they prepared to cross the Missouri River near Rocheport.

Battle of Centralia

At about 3:00 p.m., U.S. Army Major Andrew Vern Emen Johnston, a former schoolteacher without much military experience, led 146 men of the newly formed 39th Missouri Infantry Regiment (Mounted) and rode into Centralia. The townspeople warned Johnston that Anderson had at least 80 well-armed men, but Johnston led his men in pursuit. The U.S. soldiers soon encountered the guerrillas, and Johnston decided to fight them on foot. Johnston ordered his men to dismount and form a line of battle. 

Johnston then reportedly called out a challenge. Anderson's men replied by making a mounted charge. Armed with muzzle-loading Enfield rifles, the U.S. recruits were no match for the guerrillas with their revolvers. Johnston's first volley killed several guerrillas, but his men were overrun. Most were shot down as they attempted to flee. According to Frank James, his younger brother Jesse fired the shot that killed Major Johnston. Of the 147 U.S. soldiers, 123 were killed during the battle, with only one man wounded. Confederate forces lost three men and ten were wounded.

Aftermath
On September 28, 1864, in a letter to U.S. Army General William Rosecrans, U.S.  Brigadier General Clinton B. Fisk suggested depopulation and devastation in retribution for the massacre:

See also
Battle of Fort Pillow, a similar event five months earlier
Battle of Baxter Springs

References

Further reading
 Goodman, Thomas M. A thrilling record: Founded on facts and observations obtained during ten days' experience with Colonel William T. Anderson (the notorious guerrilla chieftain). Des Moines, Iowa: Mills & Co., 1868.
 The Carnage at Centralia, in Switzler, William F. History of Boone County, Missouri: Written and Comp. from the Most Authentic Official and Private Sources; Including a History of Its Townships, Towns, and Villages. Together with a Condensed History of Missouri; the City of St. Louis ... Biographical Sketches and Portraits of Prominent Citizens. St. Louis: Western Historical Company, 1882, pp. 439–467.

External links
Centralia Battlefield
The Civil War in Missouri - Animated battle
Listing of names at Jefferson City National Cemetery, Cole County, Missouri where 79 Federal Soldiers killed at Centralia are buried
Thomas D. Thiessen, Douglas D. Scott and Steven J. Dasovich. "This Work of Fiends": Historical and Archaeological Perspectives on the Confederate Guerrilla Actions at Centralia, Missouri, September 27, 1864, Lincoln Nebraska, March 2008

Conflicts in 1864
1864 in Missouri
1864 murders in the United States
Massacres in 1864
Massacres of the American Civil War
James–Younger Gang
Centralia, Missouri
Military operations of the American Civil War in Missouri
Confederate war crimes
September 1864 events
Transportation disasters in Missouri
Guerrilla warfare in the American Civil War
Prisoner of war massacres